Villain is a 2003 Indian Telugu-language action masala film written and directed by K. S. Ravikumar. The film stars Rajasekhar in dual roles, alongside Neha Dhupia and Tulip Joshi. The film is a remake of the director's own Tamil film of the same name, which released in the previous year. Sujatha and Vijayan reprise their respective roles while Vidyasagar, who composed the soundtrack for the original, was signed to compose the music for this film as well. This film marks the Telugu debuts of Dhupia, Joshi, and Vijayan.

Plot
Guru and Vishnu are identical twins. Guru, the elder one, is a bus conductor, while Vishnu, the younger one, has a mild intellectual disability. Guru overhears his parents' plot to kill Vishnu. He runs away to another city with Vishnu and strives hard to look after him. Vijayan runs a beggar trade, and beats Vishnu brutally, handicapping him for life. Guru leaves Vishnu in a home run by a social worker. During the day, Guru works as a bus conductor, and at the same time, poses as Vishnu: to play Robin Hood and steal from the rich and corrupt. A gang assist him in these operations. He is never suspected, and so, with the stolen money, he takes care of not only Vishnu, but also 800 people in other institutions for the physically handicapped. A college student falls in love with Guru, but he later learns she is Vijayan's sister-in-law. Matters worsen when Vijayan becomes the chairman of the institute for the physically disabled. How Guru deals with the situation forms the rest of the story. Meanwhile, Neha is in love with Guru, though he is unaware of this. Later she gives up her love and lets Tulip marry Guru. So, Guru marries Tulip and Neha marries Vishnu.

Cast

Rajasekhar as Guru and Vishnu
Neha Dhupia as Aisha
Tulip Joshi
Naresh
Vijayan
Rami Reddy
Sujatha 
Jeeva
Sivaji Raja
Tirupati Prakash
AVS
Siva Krishna
Rajitha
Ganesh
Costumes Krishna
Raghunatha Reddy
Bhupinder Singh
Jenny
Chittajalu Lakshmipati
Gautam Raju
Ranganath
K. S. Ravikumar in a special appearance as a Tamil director

Production
Rajasekhar watched the original Tamil version and enjoyed the film, but was initially hesitant to act in a remake. He decided to act in the remake after a member of his team encouraged him to do so. Neha Dhupia, who did an item number, in Ninne Ishtapaddanu, was signed to make her Telugu film debut with this film.

Soundtrack
Vidyasagar composed the songs for the film. Sohan Music bought the audio rights for the soundtrack. The audio launch for Villain was held on 29 October 2003. Chandrababu Naidu, the former Chief Minister of Andhra Pradesh, released the audio of the film and gave the first cassette to Pullela Gopichand, a badminton player. An event was held at Annapurna Studios in Hyderabad. During the event, Rajashekhar, the vice president of the Red Cross of Andhra Pradesh donated 50 stitching machines and wheel chairs. AVS (who is a part of the film) and Anitha handled the event.
Panchadara Chilaka - Udit Narayan, Sadhana Sargam
Naa Gunde Gudilo - P. Unnikrishnan, Sujatha Mohan	
Dummeyika Dulipeyyara - Karthik, Swarnalatha
Ee Paadu Goododili - S. P. Balasubrahmanyam
Hello Hello Mahaasaya - Tippu, Shalini Singh, Harini
Vaadichoopo Vedichoopo - Shankar Mahadevan, Sujatha

Release and reception
The film was scheduled to release on 14 November to coincide with Children's Day. Idlebrain gave the film of 2.75 out of 5 and stated how the director, K. S. Ravikumar, didn't make enough changes to the film to suit the Telugu audience. The reviewer also commented on how the first half of the film resembles Gentleman. The Full Hyderabad criticized the film and wrote how there is nothing good about the film save for Rajashekhar's performance and the twins' childhood scene.

References

External links

2003 films
Twins in Indian films
Films directed by K. S. Ravikumar
2000s Telugu-language films
Films scored by Vidyasagar
Robin Hood films
Indian action films
Telugu remakes of Tamil films
2003 action films